Patrick Comerford McAuley (31 July 1921 – 16 March 1970) was a Scottish footballer, who played for Celtic, Luton Town, Kettering Town and Albion Rovers.

References

External links 
The Celtic Wiki profile

1921 births
1970 deaths
Scottish footballers
Scottish Football League players
English Football League players
Celtic F.C. players
Luton Town F.C. players
Kettering Town F.C. players
Albion Rovers F.C. players
Scottish Football League representative players
Association football wing halves
Arthurlie F.C. players